The 1928–29 Michigan Wolverines men's basketball team represented the University of Michigan in intercollegiate college basketball during the 1928–29 season.  The team played its home games at Yost Arena on the school's campus in Ann Arbor, Michigan.  The team tied for the Western Conference Championship with the Wisconsin Badgers. The team was led by captain Ernie McCoy, who was an All-American.  George F. Veenker became the only coach in Michigan history to win the conference championship in his first season.

References

Michigan
Michigan Wolverines men's basketball seasons
Michigan Wolverines basketball
Michigan Wolverines basketball